The Ōtoko River is a river of the West Coast Region of New Zealand's South Island. It flows generally northwest from the northern slopes of Mount Hooker, reaching the Paringa River 20 kilometres south of Bruce Bay.

The New Zealand Ministry for Culture and Heritage gives a translation of "place of the staff" for Ōtoko.

See also
List of rivers of New Zealand

References

Rivers of the West Coast, New Zealand
Westland District
Rivers of New Zealand